Federal Road Safety Corps is the Government Agency with statutory responsibilities for road safety administration in Nigeria.  Founded in 1988, the Federal Road Safety Corps (FRSC) operates in all Nigerian states as well as the Federal Capital Territory and is the leading agency in Nigeria on road safety administration and management. The statutory functions include: Making the highways safe for motorists and other road users as well as checking road worthiness of vehicles, recommending works and infrastructures to eliminate or minimize accidents on the highways, and educating motorists and members of the public on the importance of road discipline on the highways.

The FRSC Corp Marshal is Dauda Ali Biu   . The Corps Marshal is the highest rank in the Corps ranking system.

Historical Perspective

Prior to the establishment of Federal Road Safety Commission in 1988, there was no concrete and sustained policy action to address the carnage on Nigerian roads. Earlier attempts in this direction were limited to discrete and isolated attempts by some states of the federation and individuals.

Notable among the efforts to institute a formidable road safety program was the effort of Shell Petroleum Development Company of Nigeria (SPDC) between 1960 and 1965. The effort of the Nigerian Army in the training of its officers and men on road safety in the early 1970s also contributed to road safety ideas and consciousness in Nigeria: The Nigerian Army started the First Public Road Safety Campaign in 1972 when it initiated an annual Road Safety Week.

The first deliberate policy on road safety was the creation in 1974 of the National Road Safety Commission (NRSC) by the then military government. The impact of the Commission was however, not sustained. In 1977, the Military Administration in Oyo State, Nigeria established the Oyo State Road Safety Corps which made some local significant improvements in road safety and road discipline in the state. That lasted till 1983, when it was disbanded by the federal government.

With the continued dangerous trend of road traffic accidents in Nigeria then, which placed it as one of the most road traffic accident (RTA) prone countries worldwide (the most in Africa) in 2013, the Nigerian government saw the need to establish the present Federal Road Safety Corps in 1988 to address the carnage on the highways.

Establishment Act

The unpleasant trend in the nation's road traffic system which resulted in upsurge in road traffic accidents made the Federal Government initiate a search for a credible and effective response to the challenge.

In February 1988, the Federal Government established the Federal Road Safety Commission through Decree No. 45 of the 1988 as amended by Decree 35 of 1992 referred to in the statute books as the FRSC Act cap 141 Laws of the Federation of Nigeria (LFN), passed by the National Assembly as Federal Road Safety Corps (establishment) Act 2007.

Statutory functions

The functions of the Commission generally relates to:

Making the highway safe for motorists and other road users.
Recommending works and devices designed to eliminate or minimize accidents on the highways and advising the Federal and State Governments including the Federal Capital Territory Administration and relevant governmental agencies on the localities where such works and devices are required, and
Educating motorists and members of the public on the importance of discipline on the highway.

In particular, the Commission is charged with responsibilities as follows:
Preventing or minimizing accidents on the highway.
Clearing obstructions on any part of the highways.
Educating drivers, motorists and other members of the public generally on the proper use of the highways.
Designing and producing the driver's license to be used by various categories of vehicle operators.
Determining, from time to time, the requirements to be satisfied by an applicant for a driver's licence.
Designing and producing vehicle number plates.
The standardization of highway traffic codes.

Educating drivers, motorists and other members of the public generally on the proper use of the highways.
Giving prompt attention and care to victims of accidents.
Conducting researches into causes of motor accidents and methods of preventing them and putting into use the result of such researches.
Determining and enforcing speed limits for all categories of roads and vehicles and controlling the use of speed limiting devices.
Cooperating with bodies or agencies or groups in road safety activities or in prevention of accidents on the highways.
Making regulations in pursuance of any of the functions assigned to the Corps by or under this Act.
Regulating the use of sirens, flashers and beacon lights on vehicles other than ambulances and vehicles belonging to the Armed Forces, Nigeria Police, Fire Service and other Paramilitary agencies;
Providing roadside and mobile clinics for the treatment of accident victims free of charge.
Regulating the use of mobile phones by motorists.
Regulating the use of seat belts and other safety devices.
Regulating the use of motorcycles on the highways.
Maintaining the validity period for drivers' licences which shall be three years subject to renewal at the expiration of the validity period.

In exercising these functions, members of the Commission have the power to arrest and prosecute persons reasonably suspected of having committed any traffic offence.

References

External links associated
 Official Website

Road safety organizations
Law enforcement agencies of Nigeria
1988 establishments in Nigeria
Road safety in Nigeria
Government of Nigeria
Economy of Nigeria